Crown Heights North Historic District is a national historic district located in the Crown Heights neighborhood of Brooklyn, Kings County, New York. The district encompasses 1,019 contributing buildings in a predominantly residential section of Brooklyn.  The district features noteworthy examples of Greek Revival, Gothic Revival, Italianate, Second Empire, Queen Anne, Romanesque Revival, Renaissance Revival, Beaux-Arts, and Colonial Revival style architecture. It largely developed between about 1853 and 1942, and consists of densely constructed rowhouses, townhouses, two-family houses, semi-attached houses, freestanding houses, flats, apartment buildings, and institutional and commercial buildings.  

Notable buildings include the former Union League Club Building (c. 1889), Union United Methodist Church (1889–1891), Brooklyn Methodist Episcopal Church Home (1889, 1913), Bedford Central Presbyterian Church (1897, 1906), Hebron French Speaking Seventh Day Adventist Church (1909), St. Gregory the Great Roman Catholic Church (1915–1916), and the former Kings County Savings Bank (1929–1930).

It was listed on the National Register of Historic Places in 2014. Two years later, its boundaries were expanded to take in 600 more buildings, including some associated with Shirley Chisholm, the first African-American woman elected to Congress.

See also

National Register of Historic Places listings in Kings County, New York

References 

Historic districts on the National Register of Historic Places in Brooklyn
New York City designated historic districts
New York City Designated Landmarks in Brooklyn
Greek Revival architecture in New York City
Gothic Revival architecture in New York City
Italianate architecture in New York City
Second Empire architecture in New York City
Queen Anne architecture in New York City
Romanesque Revival architecture in New York City
Renaissance Revival architecture in New York City
Beaux-Arts architecture in New York City
Colonial Revival architecture in New York City